

About the Delta 1 rockets

Delta A 
13. 2 October 1962 - Explorer 14 (EPE-B)
14. 27 October 1962 - Explorer 15 (EPE-C)

Delta B 
The Delta B introduce the upgraded AJ10-118D upper stage, a three-foot propellant tank extension, higher energy oxidizer, and solid-state guidance system. With the Delta B the Delta program went from "interim" to "operational" status. Delta B could launch  to GTO.

15. 13 December 1962. Relay 1, second NASA communications satellite, the NASA communications satellite first active one.
16. 13 February 1963. Pad 17B. Syncom 1; Thiokol Corporation Star-13B solid rocket as apogee motor.
20. 26 July 1963. Syncom 2; geosynchronous orbit, but inclined 33.0° due to the limited performance of the Delta rocket.

Delta C 
For Delta C, the third stage Altair was replaced with Altair 2. The Altair 2 had been developed as the ABL X-258 for the Scout vehicle and was  longer, 10% heavier, and with 65% more total thrust. OSO 4 is an example of a Delta C launch.

Delta D 
Delta D, also known as Thrust Augmented Delta, was a Delta C with the Thrust Augmented Thor core plus three Castor 1 boosters.

25. 19 August 1964. Syncom 3, the first geostationary communications satellite.
30. 6 April 1965. Intelsat I

Delta E 
First Delta E: 6 November 1965; launched GEOS 1

Delta F 
This launch vehicle was not built.

Delta G 
The Delta G was a Delta E without the third stage. The two-stage vehicle was used for two launches: Biosatellite 1 on 14 December 1966 and Biosatellite 2 on 7 September 1967.

Delta J 
The Delta J used a larger Thiokol Star 37D motor as the third stage and was launched once on 4 July 1968 with Explorer 38.

Delta K 
This launch vehicle was not built.

Delta L 
The Delta L introduced the Extended Long Tank first stage with a uniform  diameter and used the United Technologies FW-4D motor as a third stage.

Delta M 
The Delta M first stage consisted of a Long Tank Thor with MB-3-3 engine augmented with three Castor 2 boosters. The Delta E was the second stage, with a Star 37D (Burner 2) third stage/apogee kick motor. There were 12 successful Delta M launches from 1968 until 1971.

Delta N 
The Delta N combined a Long Tank Thor (MB-3-3 engine) first stage augmented with three Castor 2 boosters and a Delta E second stage. There were six successful Delta N launches from 1968 until 1972.

"Super Six" 
The "Super Six" was a Delta M or Delta N with three additional Castor 2 boosters for a total of six, which was the maximum that could be accommodated. These were respectively designated Delta M6 or Delta N6. The first and only launch of the M6 configuration was Explorer 43 (IMP-H, Magnetospheric research) on 13 March 1971. Three launches of the N6 between 1970 and 1971 resulted in one failure.
  to GTO

Delta 0100-series 
The Delta 0100 series was the first stage of the initial numbered Delta was the Long Tank Thor, a version of the Thor missile with extended propellant tanks. Up to nine strap-on solid rocket boosters (SRBs) could be fitted. With three SRBs, the Delta was designated a 300 series, while the nine SRB variant was designated the 900 series. A new and improved Delta F second-stage using the higher thrust Aerojet AJ 10-118F engine was also introduced. The first 900 series launch was the fourth Delta 0100. On 23 July 1972, Thor-Delta 904 launched Landsat 1. A license-built version of the Long Tank Thor stage with the MB-3 engine was also used for the Japanese N-I launch vehicle.

Delta 1000-series 
The Delta 1000 series was nicknamed the Straight-Eight and combined an Extended Long Tank first stage with an  payload fairing, up to nine Castor 2 SRBs, and the new McDonnell Douglas Delta P second stage using the TRW TR-201 engine. The first successful 1000 series Thor-Delta launched Explorer 47 on 22 September 1972. The Extended Long Tank Thor stage was also used in the Japanese N-II and H-I launch vehicles.

Delta 2000-series 
The Delta 2000 introduced the new Rocketdyne RS-27 main engine on an Extended Long Tank first stage with the same constant 8-foot diameter. A Delta 2310 was the vehicle for the first three-satellite launch of NOAA-4, Intasat, and AMSAT-OSCAR 7 on 15 November 1974. Delta 2910 boosters were used to launch both Landsat 2 in 1975 and Landsat 3 in 1978. On 7 April 1978, a Delta 2914 launched "Yuri 1", the first Japanese BSE Broadcasting Satellite.

Delta 3000-series 
The Delta 3000 combined the same first stage as 1000-series and 2000-series with upgraded Castor 4 solid boosters and was the last Delta series to use the McDonnell Douglas Delta P second stage with TRW TR-201 engine. Delta 3000 introduced the PAM (Payload Assist Module) / Star 48B solid-fueled kick motor, which was later used as Delta II third stage. The Delta 3914 model was approved for launching United States government payloads in May 1976 and was launched 13 times between 1975 and 1987.

Delta 4000-series 
The Delta 4000-series and 5000-series were developed in the aftermath of the Challenger disaster and consisted of a combination of 3000-era and Delta II-era components. The first stage had the MB-3 main engine and Extended Long Tank of the 3000-series and mounted upgraded Castor 4A motors. The new Delta K second stage was also included. A total of three were launched in 1989 and 1990, carrying two operational payloads.

Delta 5000-series 
The Delta 5000 series featured upgraded Castor 4A motors on an Extended Long Tank first stage with the new RS-27 main engine and only launched one mission.

Launch statistics

Launch Outcome 

Statistics are up-to-date .

Launch history

Orbital Debris 
At least eight Delta rockets have contributed orbital debris in the sun-synchronous low earth orbit environment. The variant of the Delta upper stage that was used in the 1970's was found to be prone to in-orbit explosions. Starting in 1981, depletion burns - to get rid of excess propellant - became standard and no Delta Rocket Bodies launched after 1981 experience severe fragmentations afterward, but some of those launched prior to 1981 continued to explode. In 1991, the Delta 1975-052B fragmented, 16 years after launch, demonstrating the resilience of the propellent. 

In 2017, Delta 1 Rocket Body 1968-114B, using an earlier less-fragmentation prone upper stage, fragmented into 17 pieces, nearly 50 years after launch. Though one possibility is that this rocket body exploded, the signature of the debris cloud is more indicative of a low-energy collision.

References 

Lists of Delta launches
Lists of rocket launches